The Indian Ice Hockey Championship is the national ice hockey championship in India, organised by the Ice Hockey Association of India.

Ice Hockey clubs 
The country's two oldest ice hockey clubs are the Shimla Ice Skating Club, which has existed since 1920 but began playing ice hockey much later, and the Ladakh Winter Sports Club, which was established in 1995. The present clubs affiliated to the IHAI are:
 Ladakh Winter Sports Club
Indo-Tibetan Border Police
 Ladakh Scouts
 Chandigarh Winter Games Association
 Haryana Skiing and Ice Hockey Association
 Ice Hockey Association of Maharashtra
 Ice Hockey Association of Jammu and Kashmir
 Shimla Ice Skating Club
 High Altitude Warfare School
 Ex-Servicemen League
 Kargil Ice and Snow Sports Club
 Ice Hockey Association of Uttarakhand
 Delhi Ice Hockey Association

Champions
2005: Army Red
2007: Rimo Club Leh
2008: Jammu and Kashmir Blue team
2009: Ladakh Scouts
2010: Indo-Tibetan Border Police
2011: Indo-Tibetan Border Police
2014: Ladakh Scouts
2016: Indian Army (LSRC)
2019: Indo-Tibetan Border Police
2021: Indo-Tibetan Border Police

References

External links
Teams on icehockeyindia.com
Struggles of Indian Ice Hockey National Team on www.pressreader.com

Ice hockey leagues in Asia